Debra-Jane Appelby (born c. 1967) is a British award-winning stand-up comedian. She won the third year of the Funny Women competition.

Life 
Appelby was born in Huddersfield about 1967.

In 2004 she made the semi finals of Channel 4’s So You Think You’re Funny. 2005 was her year when she won two awards. She beat Sarah Millican and Ruth Bratt in the third year of the Funny Women competition which Sarah Adams had started in 2003. She also took the main award at the Leicester Comedy Festival that year. 

She was later interviewed on BBC Radio 4's Woman's Hour by Jenni Murray when it was said that the organisers of the Funny Women competition only found out that she was born a man after the contest. The victory in a women's only competition was considered important.

References 

1960s births
Living people
Year of birth uncertain
People from Huddersfield
British stand-up comedians